Arena Bowl '89 (or Arena Bowl III) was the Arena Football League's third Arena Bowl.  The game featured the #2 Pittsburgh Gladiators against the #1 Detroit Drive. Both teams finished their seasons at 3-1, yet the Drive greatly led in points against (84-147).

Game summary
In the first quarter, Detroit drew first blood with OL-DL Reggie Mathis sacking Gladiators quarterback Willie Totten in the end zone for a safety, while Drive quarterback Tony Burris got a 1-yard quarterback sneak run for a touchdown. Pittsburgh kicker Rusty Fricke made a 55-yard field goal, and Detroit responded with FB-LB Lynn Bradford's 17-yard touchdown run.

In the second quarter, the Drive increased its lead with kicker Novo Bojovic's 50-yard field goal, yet the Gladiators refused to go down with Fricke getting a 30-yard field goal.  Bradford made a two-yard touchdown run, yet Pittsburgh responded with FB-LB Mike Powell's two-yard touchdown run (with a failed two-point conversion).

In the third quarter, the Gladiators drew closer with WR/DB Cornelius Ross returning a fumble 23 yards for a touchdown, yet the Drive responded with Burris completing a 32-yard touchdown pass to OS George LaFrance (with a failed PAT) and a 12-yard touchdown pass to WR/DB Gary Mullen.

Pittsburgh would respond with Totten completing a 19-yard touchdown pass to WR-DB Brian Gardner, yet afterwards, Detroit's defense held the Gladiators down for the rest of the game.

With the win, the Drive became the first team in Arena Football history to win back-to-back ArenaBowls.

Scoring summary
1st Quarter
 DET - Safety
 DET - Burris 1 run (Bojovic kick)
 PIT - FG Fricke 55
 DET - Bradford 17 run (Bojovic kick)
2nd Quarter
 DET - FG Bojovic 50
 PIT - FG Fricke 30
 DET - Bradford 2 run (Bojovic kick)
 PIT - Powell 2 run (Totten pass failed)
3rd Quarter
 PIT - Ross 23 Fumble Return (Fricke kick)
 DET - LaFrance 32 pass from Burris (Bojovic kick failed)
 DET - Mullen 12 pass from Burris (Bojovic kick)
 PIT - Gardner 19 pass from Totten (Fricke kick)

External links
 ArenaFan box score

003
1989 Arena Football League season
Massachusetts Marauders
Tampa Bay Storm
1989 in sports in Michigan
American football competitions in Detroit
August 1989 sports events in the United States
1989 in Detroit